Anaïs Ventard (born 20 September 1996) is a French former figure skater. She is the 2013 Lombardia Trophy bronze medalist, 2014 Bavarian Open bronze medalist, and 2013 French national champion. She trains in Annecy.

Programs

Competitive highlights 
GP: Grand Prix; CS: Challenger Series; JGP: Junior Grand Prix

References

External links 

 

French female single skaters
1996 births
Living people
Sportspeople from Haute-Savoie
Figure skaters at the 2012 Winter Youth Olympics
20th-century French women
21st-century French women